A Goan temple is known as a dēvūḷ (देवूळ)  or sansthān (संस्थान) in the Konkani language. These temples were once the centres of villages, cities, and all the other social, cultural and economic gatherings in Goa. These were known as grāmasansthās (ग्रामसंस्था) in Konkani.

History
A temple in Goa was once always the centre of a village (and in cases still is), and the lives of people were related to these temples and their festivals. The village property was divided amongst the villagers according to certain rules. The patrons of the temples are known as Mahajana and for the most part hail from Brahmin communities with a few from Kshatriya communities. This Mahajani system was once responsible for temple upkeep.

Deities

Goan temples  are strictly devoted to the worship of Panchyatan devised by Adi Shankara. The following sholka says :

आदित्यं गणनाथंच देविम् रुद्रं च केशवं |
पंच देवताम्  इत्युक्तं सर्ववर्मसु पुजयेत् ||

The following deities constitute a Panchayatana:
 Devi ( e.g. Shantadurga, Bhagavati, Navadurga, Mahalakshmi, etc. )
 Rudra or Ishwara  ( e.g.Manguesh, Nagesh, Shivnath, Damodar, Gananatha )
 Ganesh ( e.g. Mahaganapati )
 Keshava ( e.g. Lakshmi Narayana )
 Aaditya ( e.g. Surya Narayana )
In addition to these deities following deities are also worshipped.
 Kulpurush - Family Ancestor
 Ravalnath
 Bhutnath
 Gram Purush
 Kshetrapal

Architecture

Most of the original temples in Goa were demolished by the Muslim and Portuguese rulers, and the artisan castes in the Velhas Conquistas responsible for temple construction converted to Christianity during Portuguese rule. The pre-Islamic ancient temples were made of sedimentary rocks, stones, wood and limestone. Black stone temples built in the Kadamba and Hemadpanti styles are very rare. Only one ancient temple of Goa exists today in its original style, namely the Mahadev Temple. The few unconverted Hindu Brahmin families in the Velhas Conquistas emigrated to other places with the deity idols, and new temples were built to house these idols. The present day Goan temples are of Nagara architecture with some alterations, this kind of architecture is unique in India.

A water tank called as a Tali or a Tallay is usually seen at the main entrance of the temple. A large Praveshdwar or the main entrance, with a Nagar Khana is a very distinct feature of Goan temples. A Deepa stambha is an integral part of the temple.
Other related buildings with the temple:
Agrashala
Bhojanshala
Yagnya-shala
Vahanshala
 Related offices
 Nagarkhana

The temples are usually painted in white or other light colours, and usually are covered with clay tiles. A Golden Kalasha is also seen.

The parts of the temple:
 Sabhamandapa
 Antarala
 Chowk
 Garbhagruha ( Garbhakud in Konkani )
 Sarvalli ( Pradakshina marga )

The temples have wooden carvings depicting epics like Ramayana and Mahabharata. The Garbhagruha is usually studded with silver and main idol is made of black stone and sometimes Shaligrama. A Goan Konkani temple contains two murtis, one is a Mula Murti to which the alankar (adornment) is usually done and which is of ancient origin and the Utsava Murti which is displayed in the temple premises. The Utsava murtis are made of silver, gold or sometimes alloys. An alloy Prasad Murti is also seen.
The Chowk pillars are usually wooden with explicit carvings. The roof is also studded with paintings and chandeliers. Huge bells are hung at the entrance of the Chowk. This place is considered very sacred.

Festivals

The following festivals are celebrated in all the Goan temples:  
 Jatra
 Palakhi Utsav
 Navratri
 Tarangotsav, Dasarotsav
 Samvatsar (Saunsar) Padvo
 Gulalotsav
Shigmo

Related people
Mahajans
Kulavis
Pujari
Abhisheki (Purohits)
Puranik
Haridas
Devdasi (Bhavin, Kalavant)(see: Gomantak Maratha Samaj)
Vajantri
Mest
Karbhari
Bhajak
Mahale

See also
Temples of Goa Photo Gallery
Hindu temple architecture
List of temples in Goa
Vahanas used in Goan temples

References

 Abram, David. Goa, 5th edition. Rough Guides, 2003, p. 110
 Gomes, Rui Pereira. Hindu Temples and deities
 Gune, Vithal Trimbak. Gazetteer of the Union Territory Goa, Daman and Diu. Goa, Daman and Diu (India) Gazetteer Dept.

Hinduism in Goa
Hindu temples in Goa
Konkani
Buildings and structures in Goa